Hechtia carlsoniae is a plant species in the genus Hechtia. This species is endemic to Mexico.

References

carlsoniae
Flora of Mexico